The Windber Area School District is a small, rural, public school district in Somerset County, Pennsylvania and Cambria County, Pennsylvania. It is centered in the borough of Windber, and also serves Paint Boro, Paint Township, and Ogle Township in Somerset County, plus Scalp Level Boro in Cambria County. According to 2000 federal census data, it serves a resident population of 9,640.

Schools
 Windber Area Elementary School – Grades Pre-K to 5
 421 Sugar Maple Drive, Windber, Pennsylvania 15963
 Windber Area Middle School – Grades 6 to 8
 2301 Graham Avenue, Windber, Pennsylvania 15963
 Windber Area High School – Grades 9 to 12
 2301 Graham Avenue, Windber, Pennsylvania 15963

Extracurriculars
The district offers a variety of clubs, activities and sports.

Sports
The District funds:

Boys
Baseball - AA
Basketball- A
Cross Country - A
Football - A
Soccer - A
Tennis - AA
Track and Field - AA

Girls
Basketball - AA
Cross Country - A
Soccer (Fall) - A
Softball - AA
Girls' Tennis - AA
Track and Field - AA
Volleyball - A

Junior High School Sports

Boys
Basketball
Football
Soccer
Track and field

Girls
Basketball
Soccer
Track and field
Volleyball 

According to PIAA directory July 2012

References

External links
 Windber Area School District
 Appalachia Intermediate Unit 8
 Greater Johnstown Career & Technology Center
 PIAA Pennsylvania Interscholastic Athletic Association

School districts in Cambria County, Pennsylvania
School districts in Somerset County, Pennsylvania